Olga Wilhelmine Munding (born October 18, 1976) is an American New Orleans-based blues musician, producer and actress.

Early life and education
Munding was classically trained in music as a child. She went to the Nueva School  for gifted children in Hillsborough, CA, where she received a Yehudi Menuhin scholarship in classical piano, violin  and music composition. She went into public school when her parents divorced and that began a long spiral downwards into "the blues", which finally culminated into hitting rock bottom with her divorce many years from Clarksdale-based Squirrel Nut Zippers musician James "Jimbo" Mathus. She studied drama and musical theater at San Mateo Performing Arts Center in San Mateo, CA, and Judy Berlin's, Kids on Camera in San Francisco.

In college, she lived in Boulder, CO and hosted multiple radio shows  at KGNU and produced a syndicated college show called Joes Blue Plate Special which aired on over 200 college stations and had a sponsorship with Doc Martin's.  At the radio station, she hosted six regular local radio shows on KGNU Boulder/Denver CO, as well as ran the Community Calendar. In 2000, she was voted "the most alluring voice on the front range" by Best Of Boulder, Boulder Weekly newspaper.

Career

Music
Munding is a blues vocalist and guitar player known for her sultry voice and Southern sound, performing and recording under the singular name Olga™. Munding first took interest in the blues, when she was in high school. She developed her signature style through an extended tutelage under the pioneering female blues musician Jessie Mae Hemphill. Munding and Hemphill recorded together extensively and participated together in Martin Scorsese’s The Blues.

Munding has released five albums on her label 219 Records, Now Is The Time, North Mississippi Christmas, Whatever You Want,  Kiss Your Blues Away, and Blues Babe. In 2011, she released her fourth album "Whatever You Want", which was written with Cody Dickinson of the Grammy-nominated North Mississippi Allstars and mixed and produced by Emmy winning producer Winn McElroy.

She has played with Chris Isaak, Los Lobos, North Mississippi Allstars and co-engineered the Grammy nominated song, "Monkey to Man" by Elvis Costello.

She is also the founder and president of the Jessie Mae Hemphill Foundation, which honors the legendary and influential musician who served as her mentor and friend. The foundation supports, preserves, and archives the indigenous music of northern Mississippi and provides assistance for musicians in need from the region who could not survive on meager publishing royalties. This gained prominence in 2008 when Munding fought publicly with a popular musician Cat Power who has used but not credited a Hemphill song on one of her albums. On August 16, 2011, Munding was elected to the Blues Foundation's Board of Directors.

On February 3, 2012, Munding in association with the Jessie Mae Hemphill Foundation organized the “Hill Country Blues Celebration” in Como, Mississippi to celebrate the “Repatriation of Como, Mississippi Recordings, Photographs and Videos from the Alan Lomax Collection” and the loan of the Hill Country Blues Photography Collection from the Jessie Mae Hemphill (JMH) Foundation to the Emily Jones Pointer Library. Alan Lomax was an American folklorist and ethnomusicologist who traveled throughout the United States, Europe and the Caribbeans as part of his quest to record previously unrecorded and often overlooked folk music. Lomax visited the Como area during the 1950s and again in the 1970s. His recordings, photographs, and film from his time in Como comprise the collection presented to Como's Emily Jones Pointer Library. Lomax's recordings, film and photos are in the process of digitization and wider availability online.

She released her fifth album, a Christmas EP in 2012 called North Mississippi Christmas.

Acting
She has appeared in numerous television shows and movies. She acted, and co-produced in the short film, The Statue which not only screened in 36 different film festivals, it won the New Orleans Film Festival in 2010., and producing the Jessie Mae Hemphill & Friends documentary,"Dare You Do It Again". In 2016, Munding began audiobook narration.

Filmography

Discography
 Blues Babe (2003)
 Kiss Your Blues Away (2004)
 Now is the Time (2006)
  Whatever You Want (2011)
  North Mississippi Christmas (2012)

Awards
Best Original Song 2012 ("Loving You is All I Know" from Statue) at Treasure Coast International Film Festival.

Best Film, for movie Statue at Brainwash Film Festival in 2012

Best of the Fest, for Statue at Short Sweet Film Fest in 2013

Best Louisiana Film, for Vore at New Orleans Horror Film Festival 2017

Prominent positions held
In August 2015, Munding was elected as Local Board Member (New Orleans) of Screen Actors Guild - American Federation of Television and Radio Artists and elected in 2019 to the National Board. From 2011-2014, she served on the Blues Foundation's Board of Directors.

In the summer of 2020, Olga began a quest to search for fellow performers' unclaimed residuals held in trust by SAG-AFTRA  by using social media to assist in searching for performers or their estates to locate them.

References

External links
Magic Moment from Olga Wilhelmine WWOZ.org

SAG-AFTRA Board Member Olga Wilhelmine on a Mission To Connect Actors With Their Unclaimed Residuals Deadline.com
Olga Radio Pandora
Olga on imdb
Published short story about Jessie Mae Hemphill - Mississippi Folklife Magazine

1976 births
Living people
American blues guitarists
American blues singer-songwriters
American people of Austrian descent
21st-century American women singers
21st-century American women guitarists
21st-century American guitarists
Nueva School alumni
21st-century American singers